The step over (also known as the pedalada, the denílson, or the scissors, or the roeder shuffle) is a dribbling move, or feint, in association football, used to fool a defensive player into thinking the offensive player, in possession of the ball, is going to move in a direction they do not intend to move in. 

According to one source, the move was invented by Argentine striker Pedro Calomino in the early 1900s, and was first used in Europe by Dutch player Law Adam, who was famous for it in the late 1920s/early 1930s, which earned him the nickname "Adam the Scissorsman". It was later also used in Italy by Amedeo Biavati in the 1930s and was used by former Newcastle United player Glenn Roeder in the 1980s. The step over was popularised in the mid-1990s by Brazilian footballer and global superstar Ronaldo. Nowadays, the technique is in widespread use by attacking players all over the world, such as Cristiano Ronaldo and Neymar.

References

Source
Books

External links

 BBC Sport | Football | Skills | The Step over

Association football skills
Association football terminology